is a passenger railway station in located in the city of Wakayama, Wakayama Prefecture, Japan, operated by West Japan Railway Company (JR West).

Lines

Station layout
The station consists of two opposed side platforms located on an embankment, and connected to the station building by stairs. The station is unattended.

Platforms

Adjacent stations

|-
!colspan=5|JR West

History
The Wakayama Line Kii-Nakanoshima Station was opened on January 1, 1935 and the Hanwa Electric Railway station was forced to shift 100 meters to the south. On September 25, 1936, the Hanwa Electric Railway station was abolished, and its operations were transferred to Kii-Nakanoshima Station. On December 1, 1940, the Hanwa Electric Railway was merged into the Nankai Electric Railway, which was nationalized on May 1, 1944 with the line becoming the Hanwa Line. On October 1, 1974 due to a re-routing of the Wakayama Line, only the Hanwa Line remained at Kii-Nakanoshima Station. With the privatization of the Japan National Railways (JNR) on April 1, 1987, the station came under the aegis of the West Japan Railway Company. In March 2018, station numbering was introduced with Kii-Nakanoshima being assigned station number JR-R53.

Passenger statistics
In fiscal 2019, the station was used by an average of 462 passengers daily (boarding passengers only).

Surrounding Area
 Wakayama City Kinokawa Junior High School

See also
List of railway stations in Japan

References

External links

 Kii-Nakanoshima Station Official Site

Railway stations in Wakayama Prefecture
Railway stations in Japan opened in 1932
Wakayama (city)